Trg Republike means Republic Square in most South Slavic languages and may refer to:

in Serbia:
 Republic Square, Belgrade
 Republic Square, Novi Sad
 Republic Square, Niš
 Republic Square, Niška Banja
 Republic Square, Smederevo
 Republic Square, Sombor
 Republic Square, Požarevac
 Republic Square, Vranje
in Montenegro:
 Republic Square, Podgorica
in Slovenia:
 Republic Square, Ljubljana

See also
 Republic Square (disambiguation)